The 1926 Buffalo Rangers season was their seventh in the league. The team improved on their previous output of 1–6–2, winning four games. They finished ninth in the league.

Background
In response to the creation of the Los Angeles Buccaneers, the revival of the Louisville Colonels as well as the AFL I's Los Angeles Wildcats, Buffalo (under new coach Jim Kendrick) changed its name for one year to the Buffalo Rangers, also known as the Texas Rangers. The team, although remaining based in Buffalo, would consist mostly of players from the state of Texas and the Southwestern United States. (Coincidentally, there was—and is—a city known as Buffalo, Texas.) The team had little to lose; after the retirement of star player and part-owner Tommy Hughitt after the 1924 season, the team slid to 1–6–2 in 1925.

Although the team returned to .500 play, sporting a 4–4–2 record (the best record the team would have without Hughitt), the experiment was not continued after 1926.

Schedule

Standings

References

Buffalo Rangers seasons
Buffalo Rangers
Buffalo